Troy Bodie (born January 25, 1985) is a Canadian former professional ice hockey winger. Bodie was drafted by the Edmonton Oilers in the 2003 NHL Entry Draft. He last played for the Toronto Maple Leafs of the National Hockey League (NHL), but has also spent time with the Anaheim Ducks and Carolina Hurricanes. Since May 2021, he is the director of hockey and business operations for the Seattle Kraken's American Hockey League farm team, the Coachella Valley Firebirds.

Playing career
Bodie was drafted 278th overall by the Edmonton Oilers in the 2003 NHL Entry Draft from the Western Hockey League's Kelowna Rockets. Bodie had spells in the ECHL with the Stockton Thunder and the American Hockey League for the Hamilton Bulldogs and the Springfield Falcons before signing a one-year contract with the Anaheim Ducks on July 22, 2008.

Bodie spent much of the 2008-09 season in the AHL with the Iowa Chops but played four games for the Ducks without scoring a point. Bodie re-signed with the Ducks to a two-year two-way contract on June 30, 2009.

On November 16, 2010, Bodie was claimed off of waivers from the Ducks by the Carolina Hurricanes. When playing for Carolina, Bodie racked up a total of 12 fights and 6 goals; one of which being the game winner in overtime against the Buffalo Sabres on goaltender Ryan Miller.

On October 12, 2011, Bodie signed a two-way contract worth $550,000 in the NHL and $105,000 in the AHL to return with the Anaheim Ducks. He was assigned for the duration of the 2011–12 season with Anaheim's farm team, the Syracuse Crunch in the AHL.

Continuing with the new Ducks affiliate, the Norfolk Admirals, on a try-out during the 2012–13 season, Bodie was later re-signed by the Ducks, on a one-year contract on January 16, 2013.

On July 10, 2013, Bodie signed a one-year, two-way contract with the Toronto Maple Leafs.  During training camp in 2014, the Leafs assigned Bodie to their AHL-affiliate, the Toronto Marlies. Bodie would spend the next two seasons playing for both clubs, and even served as Marlies captain during his final playing season, being given the honour on February 22, 2015.

Post-playing career
On September 21, 2015, Bodie announced his retirement from the NHL and accepted a position as a professional scout with the Toronto Maple Leafs based out of the Los Angeles area. In 2018, he was promoted to director of professional scouting for the Leafs.

In May 2021, Bodie was hired by the Seattle Kraken expansion team to be the director of hockey and business operations of their American Hockey League farm team, the Coachella Valley Firebirds, set to begin play in 2022.

Personal life
In August 2013, Bodie married Francesca Leiweke, the daughter of former Maple Leafs Sports & Entertainment president, Tim Leiweke.

Career statistics

References

External links

1985 births
Anaheim Ducks players
Canadian ice hockey forwards
Carolina Hurricanes players
Edmonton Oilers draft picks
Hamilton Bulldogs (AHL) players
Ice hockey people from Manitoba
Iowa Stars players
Kelowna Rockets players
Living people
Norfolk Admirals players
Portland Pirates players
San Antonio Rampage players
Sportspeople from Portage la Prairie
Springfield Falcons players
Stockton Thunder players
Syracuse Crunch players
Toronto Maple Leafs players
Toronto Maple Leafs scouts
Toronto Marlies players